Riverbanks Center (also known as Marikina Riverbanks/Marikina Riverbanks Center or simply Riverbanks) is an integrated development complex for shopping, recreational, business and commercial along Andres Bonifacio Avenue adjacent to Marikina River in Barangka, Marikina, Metro Manila, Philippines. It is home of the Philippine's biggest outdoor amphitheater and outlet center, and the location of once the world's largest pair of shoes.

History
Riverbanks Center is located on a  site which formerly held a Universal Textile Mills Factory, Asia's largest textile mills at that time. The Riverbanks Development Corporation acquired the site in 1995. It opened to the public in April 1999.

The creators attempted to have it certified for the 2004 edition of the Guinness World Records, but due to space limitations the alleged record was not published in the book.

On September 26–27, 2009, the complex was widely devastated by a flash flood from the overflowing Marikina River, due to torrential rains caused by Tropical Storm Ondoy. The river reached the 23-meter mark, enough to flood the entire complex.

Facilities

Retail

Riverbanks Mall hosts numerous establishments includes the following major tenants: SM's Savemore Market, the first ever Savemore Market in the Philippines opened in 1998 (earlier than opening of the whole complex the following year), Off Price Department Store, Shoe Gallery,
Timezone and Robinsons two standalone stores: Handyman and Robinsons Appliances. There are also main sections divided into 3 zones: Foodcourt (eateries and food stalls), Technolane (electronics and gadgets) and Fashion Gallery (boutiques and specialty stores), while Kidzone (playroom), Timezone (arcades) and Shoe Gallery (showcasing the shoes made in Marikina) are among sub-sections inside the Mall. Variety of retail kiosks are also available at the center lanes. Arcade Building, an annex building of the Mall, is also hosts some establishments such as banks, coffee shops, fastfood chains, pharmacies, retail stores, offices and others. Some establishments such as 24-hour convenience store, spas and other service counters are also located at E-COM building. There is also standalone store building like fastfood chains Greenwich and Jollibee located at the North Triangle open area, and a pre-owned car dealer shop Kotse Network.

Outlet center
Riverbanks Center is known for the largest outlet store in the Philippines located inside the Riverbank Mall, some of these were branded includes Accel, Adidas, Bambu, Converse, Guess, Kids Republic, Levi's, Nike, Peak, Puma, Reebok, Royal Sporting House, Shubizz, The Look Boutique, World Balance and among others. Inside the Shoe Gallery is showcasing and selling the locally produced leather shoes and other footwears and apparels made in Marikina at the very low price.

Offices

Riverbanks Center's ICT Building and E-COM Building are listed as approved IT Centers by the Philippine Economic Zone Authority, making export-oriented companies located therein eligible for temporary tax holiday, permanent reduced rate of corporate income tax, and other incentives. , it is one of only two developments in Marikina to have this status, the other being Blue Wave-Marikina IT Center. The first call center to locate in Riverbanks, and by extension the whole of Marikina, was the NASDAQ-listed ICT Group, who moved in during 2006. ICT already had offices in Makati and Ortigas Center since 2003 and 2004, respectively. The new ICT office initially employed 1,400 staff. Riverbanks Center's administration office, NBI Satellite Office and Queen of Angels Chapel are also located in E-COM Building.

Recreation

Riverbanks Center is also a place for recreation and leisure and it is a perfect place for jogging, biking, boating and camping. Riverbanks Plaza and Riverbanks Amphiteather are the center of attractions for recreation. There is also called "Dampa", a seafood and grill station that perfect for family dining, and there is Bonfire Grill, a bar and restaurant offers live band perfect for group of friends especially at night. There are also educational facilities in the complex, the Philippine Science Centrum, an interactive museum, is located in E-COM Building, it opened in 1990 in Pasay, but later moved to its present site which was donated by Riverbanks Development Corporation. There are also museums such as Museum of Miniatures, Joey Velasco Gallery and The Spirit of Bethlehem Museum that also perfect for educational field trips and for those who like in arts, while the largest pair of shoes is located inside the Shoe Gallery of Riverbanks Mall.

Events venues

Event venues in the complex includes the Riverbank Amphitheater, a 20,000 capacity features an amphitheater with wide flat stage (or movable mounted stage) which makes it ideal for musical concerts, entertainment shows, stage plays, religious assemblies, graduations, sports tournaments and other major events such as the annual Philippine National Fireworks Festival held in April. Activity Area is also hold various events such as motor shows, pageants, job fairs, food festivals and bazaars during Christmas season. Renaissance Convention Center can also hold indoor social gathering and other private functions. Other event venues in the complex include "The Deck" and "The Studio". The latter is a studio building where a number of TV series, commercials and movies are filmed.

Parking
Parking in the complex includes covered and open-air parking with corresponding fee, the complex has also a pedestrian-friendly driveways.

Other facilities

 Courtyard Dormtel - is a dormitory-type hotel that can accommodate guests. It is also linked to the Renaissance Convention Center.
 Pink River Gazebo - a pavilion structure that perfect for meeting place and other functions.
 People's Bridge - there is also pontoon called "people's bridge", a floating bridge for those pedestrians going to SM City Marikina or the other side of riverbank by crossing the river.
 Riverbanks Station - is a proposed water-based ferry terminal and it is currently not yet operational.
 Riverbanks Transport Terminal, Taxi Bays - it offers UV Express Shuttle transport service going to Eastwood City, Ortigas Center and Ayala Center, as well as route to San Mateo. Taxi bays as well as jeepneys and tricycles going to city center and other narrow streets in the vicinity are also available.
 Riverland Express Train - this is an actual vintage steam train used in Pampanga and Tarlac in early 20th century. This is also symbolizes that Marikina was once traversing the old "Marikina Line" towards San Mateo from Rosario in Pasig before the World War II.
 Statue Carabaos - symbolizes the rich farmland of Marikina during early years.

Transportation
The complex is in a strategic location and accessible via most modes of transportation, particularly jeepneys, tricycles and buses. Riverbanks Station is a proposed water-based ferry terminal and not yet operational. Riverbanks Transport Terminal offers transport service to selected points in Metro Manila. Taxi bays and tricycle terminals can also found in the complex. Riverbanks Avenue connecting Andres Bonifacio Avenue and Marcos Highway that traversed the complex is the main road and accessible towards Eastwood City, Ortigas Center, Makati, Bonifacio Global City, NAIA and South Luzon Expressway via C-5 Road. Santolan Station of the LRT Line 2 is the nearest train station along Marcos Highway. Metro Manila Eastern Transport Hub is also located near the complex. The terminal provides provincial buses for the passengers going to any point of Luzon and as far as Visayas region via Roll-on/roll-off.

Events

 ChristmaSaya (mid-October to March of the next year)
 Riverbanks Year-end Concert and Fireworks Display (December 30)
 Philippine International Fireworks Festival (every Saturday of April)

References

External links

Riverbanks Center official website
Philippine Science Centrum

Mixed-use developments in Metro Manila
Science parks in Metro Manila
Shopping districts and streets in Metro Manila
Buildings and structures in Marikina
Redeveloped ports and waterfronts in the Philippines